Gordon Stephen Piper (3 June 1932 – 18 September 2004) was an Australian actor, theatre director and scriptwriter and comedian active in all facets of the industry including radio, stage, television (including soap opera and TV movies) and film. He remains best known as plumber Bob Hatfield in A Country Practice.

Early life
Piper was born on 3 June 1932 to parents Clive Reginald Piper and Mildred Nelly Piper (nee Johnson) on their dairy farm in the Sydney suburb of Cheltenham. He began performing as a child, singing soprano for the Sydney Boys' Choir and making his radio debut with a choir on 2FC.

Acting career
Piper began his professional career acting in radio plays, and later branched out to touring variety acts which toured local pubs and clubs. He worked as a television extra for several years, before taking to the stage for a theatre career. Notable roles in the 1970s included a long-running stint in the play Dimboola, and a role as a bartender in the film My Brilliant Career. He was also involved in Werrington's own Henry Lawson Theatre performing both on stage and as director.

Piper is best known for his long-term role as town plumber Robert Menzies "Bob" Hatfield in the television soap A Country Practice, appearing from episode 4 of that series in 1981 until 1992, becoming one of the longest-serving actors in an Australian drama series, until he was written out of the series with co-star Syd Heylen as the producers wanted to concentrate on a younger cast and an updated formula. The decision was later regretted and co-star Brian Wenzel agreed in an interview in TV Week that the two actors were a large part of the series' comedic storylines. Other television roles included Homicide, Boney, Spyforce, and the made for TV film Hector's Bunyip. He appeared in the film The Dark Room. 

Piper served as the associate director of the Arts Council of New South Wales. He was also a founding member of P.A.C.T. (Producers, Actors, Composers and Talents), one of the best-known actors' studios in Sydney. He and actor Leonard Teale produced "fill-ins" for ABC-TV prior to the widespread broadcasting of music videos.

Personal life
Piper's wife Judith Ann Piper (formerly Price) died in 1981 and he wrote and directed an episode of A Country Practice in dedication to her and her story. Gordon's daughter Kerrin-Gai and son Kim both live in Australia.

In 1999, Piper was charged with the sexual molestation of an 11-year-old girl who attended his house at Penrith to help him unpack boxes. Piper, however, always maintained his innocence and was subsequently acquitted of the charges.

Piper suffered from diabetes, which affected his circulation and eventually resulted in the amputation of both his legs. He suffered a cardiac arrest and was taken to Blacktown Hospital and died on 19 September 2004 at the age of 72.

Filmography

References

External links
 Gordon Piper tribute website
 

1932 births
2004 deaths
Australian male television actors
People from New South Wales
Australian amputees
20th-century Australian male actors